Apollon Limassol FC (Apollon Lemesou) is a Cypriot sports club, based in Limassol. It has football, basketball and volleyball teams. Founded in 1954, Apollon FC currently plays in the Cypriot First Division and has won the championship title four times, the cup nine times and the Super Cup four times.

History
At the end of 1953, a team of young men placed as a dream and objective, the foundation of an association with national and athletic aims based on promoting the education and social skills of its young members. On 14 April 1954, the general assembly of these members with leader Mr Christakis Pavlides proposes the foundation of an athletic association called "APOLLON LIMASSOL".
The assembly approved the proposal and thus from that date "APOLLON was born". The first administrative council of the team included: Charalambos Lymbourides (Secretary), Andreas Psyllides (Cashier), Antonakis Fourlas (Adviser), Melis Charalampous (Adviser), Andreas Theoharous (Adviser) Andreas Aggelopoulos (Adviser) and Kostas Panayiotou (Adviser).

In its first year, Apollon had eight defeats in eight matches in the second division. Just before the next season (1956–57), Apollon won the regional group in the second division and subsequently the play-offs and then was promoted to the first division.

This took place in 1957 and ever since Apollon has been competing in the first division. Through its history, Apollon won four Championships (1991, 1994, 2006, 2022), nine Cups (1966, 1967, 1986, 1992, 2001, 2010, 2013, 2016, 2017), three Super Cup (2006, 2016, 2017) and also had some very successful participation in European competitions, winning several important games and at the same time, the respect of many European football clubs during the several participations in the Group Stage of the Europa League.

1954–1955: Early years
In its first year, Apollon suffered eight defeats in eight matches in the second division. Just before the next season (1956–57), Apollon won the regional group in the second division and subsequently the play-offs and then was promoted to the first division. This took place in 1957 and ever since Apollon has been competing in the first division. Things were not easy however for the newly promoted club. Apollon couldn't reach a satisfactory position in the rankings and was struggling in the middle of the table for many years. But in the mid-60's things changed.

1964–1967: The first distinctions
In 1965 Apollon reached the Cup Final. However, Omonia won the title with a score of 5–1. A year later, Apollon was in the Final again, and won the Cup by defeating Nea Salamina with the score of 4–2 (Scorers: Panikos Yiolitis, Andros Konstantinou, Panikkos Krystallis, Antonis Panayides), and triumphantly took the trophy to Limassol. Apollon managed to maintain its Cup title in 1967, by beating Alki 1–0 thanks to the goal of Antonis Panayides. After celebrating these titles, Apollon had to wait another 15 years to start making history once again.

1981–1987: Back to the Cup Final after 20 fallow years
In the football season 1981–82 Apollon managed to reach once again the Cup final however in double games Omonia won the Cup. In the 1985–86 season, after 20 years of "drought" Apollon won once again the Cup in Tsirion Stadium, overcoming APOEL with a score of 2–0. Scores were Kenny and Sokratous.

1990–1999: 10 years of glory

In these years, it emerged clearly that absent was this "something" that could make the difference for the team to lead in the Championship. This "something" therefore was non-other than the German coach named Diethelm Ferner who, upon arriving in Cyprus was determined to win. The German, with his discipline and hard work accomplishes "links" between young talented footballers with older more experienced footballers creating a team ready for the big time. Thus in the season 1990–91 the team entered the championship "marathon" wanting to write the biggest and most glorious page in its history book. After a frantic and impressive season, offering both substance and spectacle in its game, Apollon was finally crowned Champion of Cyprus!
From that year and for a five-year period the team gained the admiration of all Cypriot football fans after playing modern football.
In 1991–92 season Apollon won the Cup for the fourth time, overcoming Omonia in final with a final score of 1–0. The scorer was Evgenio Ptak. However, in the next season of 1992–93 Apollon lost both titles.
The team returned strongly and gained the club's second Championship one year later in the 1993–94 season, later after a hard duel with Anorthosis where the title was judged on the last day of the season.
In the 1994–95 season Apollon reached the Cup final losing to Apoel with 2–4 while the same happened also in the 1997–98 season with "executioner" this time the almighty Anorthosis, that accomplishes and gains the cup with a final score 1–3. In that five-year period Apollon was accomplished in the European ties, winning enough games and at the same time the respect of many European football clubs. However, the game, in which Apollon wrote his own unique history is non-other than with the big opponent of Inter Milan in the UEFA Cup! The 1–0 in "Stadio Giuseppe Meazza" (San Siro) left margins for Apollon to believe in a miracle, against the Italians for the second leg game of 3 November 1993. The Cup Champions, staffed with a squad of international players led by Dutchman Dennis Bergkamp talked for a walkover in Cyprus against "fishermen" (thus called the footballers of Apollon the goalkeeper of Inter, Walter Zenga before the game) and that the game in Milan was just a bad game for their team. However, the Inter team was found in Limassol, losing in the first ten minutes with a 0–2 score and only finally managed to recover and to finish another historic tie with 3–3, leaving at the end the great Italian goalkeeper speechless!. Scorers for the Apollon team were Milenko Špoljarić, Zlatan Šcepovic and Giorgos Iosifidis.

2000–2010: 1 Championship, 2 Cups and 1 Super Cup

In the 2000–01 season Apollon won the cup against Nea Salamis Famagusta in the GSP stadium, with final score 1–0. Scorer was the unforgettable Viktor Zubarev.

In the middle of the football season (2004–05) and after enough failed attempts for glory after the final of 2001, German manager Bernd Stange took the responsibility, accomplishing late but regularly he brought back the lost glamour of the team. In the season, 2005–06 Apollon won the league title undefeated and earned a club record of 64 points. Apollon had 19 wins and 7 draws in 26 matches and this went down in Cypriot Football history, due to fact that it was the fourth team in the Cyprus Championship that won the title unbeaten (*Apollon was the only undefeated team in Europe, running an unbeaten streak since 12 March 2005 (30 games). The next year Apollon won for the first time in his history the Super Cup beating APOEL 1–3 at home.

In 2010 Apollon won the Cup after 9 years (2001 Final Cup), beating APOEL Nicosia in GSZ Stadium. The final score was 2–1.

2010–11: Cup finalists
The following year (2011), Apollon reached the final of the Cypriot Cup for the second consecutive year, but lost to Omonia on penalties, after a 1–1 draw following extra time

2012–13: Cypriot Cup winners
On 22 May 2013, Apollon won the Cup after three years (last Cup won in 2010). Apollon won in the final by beating 1–2 AEL Limassol at Tsirion Stadium in extra time, achieving the club's 7th Cypriot Cup title. Apollon fans are very demanding and loyal to the Club and after 3 years they celebrated the Cup by singing, drinking, celebrating the whole week.

2013–14: Gold history and big dreams
Apollon Limassol skipper Giorgos Merkis implored his team-mates not to rest on their laurels after securing a famous 2–0 victory against OGC Nice in the first leg of their 2013–14 UEFA Europa League play-off.
Christakis Christoforou's men were billed as overwhelming underdogs going into the tie, but a second-half double from Argentinian forward Gaston Sangoy has put them in a commanding position ahead of the 29 August decider at Stade Municipal du Ray. The next week Apollon travelled to Nice and the dream came true. Apollon lost 1–0 from OGC-Nice but qualified at the group stage of Europa League for the first time in the team's history. In the group stage Apollon will play with: Lazio, Trabzonspor and Legia Warsaw. At the debut match at GSP stadium in Nicosia in the group stage of Europa League Apollon Limassol defeated by Trabzonspor 1–2 and the scorer was the team's star Gaston Sangoy. On 26 September Apollon became the first Cypriot side to win a game in Poland on matchday two, ending a seven-game losing streak away from home in Europe to beat Legia Warsaw 1–0. Scorer against Polish side was again Gaston Sangoy. It is the first away victory for a Cypriot side in a UEFA club competition group stage in their last 16 attempts. In the third match on 24 October, Apollon claimed a 0–0 draw against Serie A side Lazio in Nicosia to keep alive their chances of qualifying from UEFA Europa League Group J.

2014–15 Europa league Gold dreams
After finishing 3rd in the 2013–14 Cypriot First Division, Apollon entered the 2014–15 UEFA Europa League play-off round, where they faced Russian Premier League club Lokomotiv Moscow. The first leg was held in Cyprus and ended with a 1–1 draw. The second leg, held in Moscow, ended with a 4–1 win to the guests and brought Apollon to the group stage of the competition. Apollon became the first team in Cyprus to qualify for a European competition by winning in an away game in the play-off round for two consecutive years as well as joining UEFA Europa League for two years in a row.

Apollon, having three points, were out of the competition after losing to FC Zürich in a replay match.
2021-22 1st championship title after sixteen years since 2006 and 4th title in history

Crest and colours
The team' s emblem represents the olympian God Apollo from the Greek mythology. Apollo was considered the god of sun, poetry and music. The colours of the team are blue and white. They represent the colours of the Greek flag as the creation of the team was well connected with the struggles of Cypriot people for unification with Greece. The away colours are white and the home kit blue.

Other teams

Basketball team

The Basketball team of Apollon was founded in 1967 and is one of the founding members of Cyprus Basketball Federation. From then the team participated regularly in the championship of 1st Division. The unique titles in the history of department, are two cups in 2002 and 2014 and a Super Cup in 2004. While it finished many times in second places.

Volleyball team
A Founding member of the Cyprus Volleyball Federation, the women's team participated in several Championship finals (1999, 2001, 2003, 2010, 2011, 2012, 2013) and in eight Cup finals (1992, 1997, 1998, 2000, 2003, 2011, 2012, 2013) .
Apollon won:	6 National Championships (2011, 2014, 2015, 2016, 2017,2022), 5 National Cups (2014– AEK Larnaca 3–0, 2015– AEK Larnaca 3–0, 2016– AEL Limassol 3–0, 2017-Anorthosis Famagusta 3–1,2021-Olympiada Neapolis 3–0), 6 Super Cups (2003– AEL 3–0, 2013– Anorthosis Famagusta 3–0, 2014– AEK Larnaca 3–0, 2015– AEK Larnaca 3–2, 2016– AEL 3–2, 2021-olympiada Neapolis 3–2)

Women's football team

The women's team has won the Cypriot First Division as well as the Cypriot Women's Cup four consecutive times from 2009 to 2012 and from 2014 to 2017. The team also reached the UEFA Women's Champions League round of 32 in 2010,2011,2012,2013,2014 and 2016.

On 15 October 2013, Apollon Limassol girls win the first Super Cup Beating Anorthosis 3–0 in the final, Anorthosis had won the double the previous year and played Apollon Limassol in the cup final.

Stadium
Football

The team's stadium was the 13,331 seater Tsirio Stadium until 2022. It was also the home ground of AEL Limassol and Aris Limassol. The stadium was built in 1975.

The construction of the Alphamega Stadium replaced Tsirio Stadium as the home ground of Apollon. The capacity of the new stadium is 10,700 seats.

Basketball/Volleyball

Apollon has its own indoor hall, the PrimeTel Apollon Stadium, with a capacity of 2,800 seats.

Supporters

In 1981, the organised portion of the supporters of the club, elected council members and began organising themselves, in a tiny room of the clubhouse (where it now houses the offices of the football Company) the membership fee was then 10 Cypriot cents. Later on in 1982 after the positive response in enlisting new members of the fan club, the cost of registration was increased to 2 Cyprus pounds. At a time when no other team had yet an organised group of fans on the island, a new fan club was registered. The registration was triggered after a game in Paphos where the followers of Apollon made an organised excursion something that had not been done previously. On their return, everyone was happy with the experience, that they agreed to set up formally and officially the Sy.Fi Association (Apollon Limassol)-Apollon Limassol Fan club. In 1982 Costas Katafygiotis was elected first president of the Apollon Sy.Fi in September 1982. The next year the fan club worked in an official manner. Chaired by Dino it opened in parallel a souvenir shop on the street and gained its Independence from the football club and became a housing association for the fans. Later, the Apollon Sy.Fi renamed itself to PA.SY.FI Apollon (Apollon Cyprus Association of Supporters) and much later PAN.SY.FI APOLLON (Pan Hellenic Supporters Association of Apollon) to show the bond of our association with Greece.

From 1996 onwards PAN.SY.FI became synonymous with GATE-1 a designation which originated from the entrance gate in the West Tsireio stadium stand, where members gather.

PAN.SY.FI Apollon Gate 1 is the name of the supporters fan club.

Apollon is amongst the most popular football teams in Cyprus. The fans are very demanding and loyal to the club.
More than 14,000 Apollon fans traveled from Limassol for the 2001 Cup Final that took place in Nicosia (16,828 tickets). This number also beat the previous top record for a team traveling for an away game to Nicosia. Celebrations for winning the League championship for the 1993–94 season following the victory against Omonoia FC More than 20,000 fans overflowed the Stadium to see Apollon clinch the title in the final game of the season. Celebrations following the victory against Omonoia FC at the 1992 FA Cup Final in Tsirio, stadium. More than 20,000 fans attended the game.

Players

Current squad

Out on loan

Club officials

Board of directors

Source: apollon.com.cy

Staff

Source: apollon.com.cy

Technical and medical staff

Source: apollon.com.cy

Sponsorship

Main sponsors 
 Major Sponsor – Stoiximan
 Official Sponsors:
 BEON1X
 Puma
 Petrolina
 Mitbah
 GNI
 Columbia Restaurants
 Royal Caribbean International
 Conercon Energy Solutions 
 Lamberts
 Tixee

Supporters

 Pizza Hut
 Hadjiyiannis
 A.V. PremierSoft Ltd
 Zita Dairies Industry Ltd
 Property Gallery
 OSHEE Isotonic Drinks
 Cyp-Сana Alarms Ltd
 K.P.N Consulting Ltd
 Unotel Communications Ltd
 Vittel Natural Mineral Water
 BIG STAR

Source: apollon.com.cy

Honours

Domestic
Cypriot First Division
Champions (4): 1990–91, 1993–94, 2005–06, 2021–22
Runners-up (6): 1983–84, 1988–89, 1992–93, 1996–97, 2017–18, 2020–21
Cypriot Cup
Winners (9): 1965–66, 1966–67, 1985–86, 1991–92, 2000–01, 2009–10, 2012–13, 2015–16, 2016–17
Runners-up (8): 1964–65, 1981–82, 1986–87, 1992–93, 1994–95, 1997–98, 2010–11, 2017–18
Cypriot Super Cup
Winners (4): 2006, 2016, 2017, 2022
Cypriot Second Division
Winners (1): 1956–57

European competition history

Matches

Notes
 QR: Qualifying round
 PR: Preliminary round
 1R: First round
 2R: Second round
 1Q: First qualifying round
 2Q: Second qualifying round
 3Q: Third qualifying round
 PO: Play-off round
 1: Both matches played in Belgium.
 2: Both matches played in Netherlands.

Source: UEFA.com

See also
 Limassol derby

References

External links

 Official Website
 Apollon Ladies FC

 
Association football clubs established in 1954
Football clubs in Cyprus
Volleyball clubs in Cyprus
Women's volleyball teams in Cyprus
1954 establishments in Cyprus
Unrelegated association football clubs